The Witterings is an electoral ward of Chichester District, West Sussex, England and returns three members to sit on Chichester District Council.

Following a district boundary review, The Witterings was created from the East Wittering and West Wittering wards in 2019.

Councillor

Election results

References

External links
 Chichester District Council
 Election Maps

Witterings